The Chicago plan was a monetary and banking reform program suggested in the wake of the Great Depression by a group of University of Chicago economists including Henry Simons, Garfield Cox, Aaron Director, Paul Douglas, Albert G. Hart, Frank Knight, Lloyd Mints and Henry Schultz. Its main provision was to require 100% reserves on deposits subject to check, so that "the creation and destruction of effective money through private lending operations would be impossible". The plan, in other words, envisaged to separate the issuing from the lending of money. This, according to its authors, would prevent the money supply from cyclically varying as bank loans were expanded or contracted. In addition, the payment system would become perfectly safe. No great monetary contraction as that of 1929-1933 could ever occur again.

This idea of 100% reserves on checking deposits would be advocated by other economists in the 1930s, including Lauchlin Currie of Harvard and Irving Fisher of Yale. A more recent variant of this reform idea is to be found in the "narrow banking" proposal.

Although the Chicago Plan is often likened to other 100% reserve plans (such as Fisher's), there were some important differences between them, for example regarding bank intermediation. The Chicago Plan would not only have subjected checking deposits to 100% reserves, but further eliminated fractional-reserve banking per se: banks could no longer make loans out of savings deposits, and would be replaced in their lending function by equity-financed investment trusts. Other proponents of 100% reserves, however, such as Currie and Fisher, would still have allowed commercial banks to make loans out of savings deposits, as long as these could not be made transferable by check. As Fisher put it in 1936, the banks would be free to lend money “provided we now no longer allow them to manufacture the money that they lend”.

An important motivation of the Chicago Plan was to prevent the nationalization of the banking sector, which, in the context of the Great Depression, was considered by some as a real possibility. This concern was shared by Fisher: "In short: nationalize money, but do not nationalize banking”.

History

Origins (1933) 
A six-page memorandum on banking reform was given limited and confidential distribution to about forty individuals on 16 March 1933. The plan was supported by such notable economists as Frank H. Knight, Paul H. Douglas, and Henry C. Simons, as well as by Lloyd W. Mints, Henry Schultz, Garfield V. Cox, Aaron Director,  and Albert G. Hart.

Between March and November 1933, the Chicago economists received comments from a number of individuals on their proposal, and in November 1933, another memorandum was prepared. The memorandum was expanded to thirteen pages; there was a supplementary memorandum on "Long-time Objectives of Monetary Management" (seven pages) and an appendix titled "Banking and Business Cycles" (six pages).

These memoranda generated much interest and discussion among lawmakers. However, the suggested reforms, such as the imposition of 100% reserves on demand deposits, were shelved and replaced by less drastic measures. The Banking Act of 1935 institutionalized federal deposit insurance and the separation of commercial and investment banking. It successfully restored the public's confidence in the banking system and ended discussion of banking reform.

A Program for Monetary Reform (1939) 
As America entered the Recession of 1937-1938, this caused renewed discussion of the key elements of the Chicago plan, and in July 1939 a new proposal was drafted, titled A Program for Monetary Reform. The draft paper was attributed on its cover page to six American economists: Paul H. Douglas, Irving Fisher, Frank D. Graham, Earl J. Hamilton, Wilford I. King, and Charles R. Whittlesey. It claimed that 235 economists from 157 universities and colleges had expressed approval of the draft with 40 more had "approved it with reservations" and "43 have expressed disapproval."

The proposal was never published. A copy of the paper was apparently preserved in a college library. Copies of the paper, stamped on the bottom of the first and last pages, “LIBRARY – COLORADO STATE COLLEGE OF A. & M. A. – FORT COLLINS COLORADO” were circulated at the 5th Annual American Monetary Institute Monetary Reform Conference (2009) and the images were scanned for display on the internet.

The Chicago plan, and was submitted to the Government, but did not result in any new legislation.

IMF's Chicago plan revisited (2012) 
In August 2012, the proposal was given renewed attention after the International Monetary Fund (IMF) published a working paper by Jaromir Benes and Michael Kumhof. In the paper, the authors have updated the original Chicago plan proposal to fit into today's economy. They conclude that the advantages of such a system, according to the authors, are a more balanced economy without the booms and busts of the current system, the elimination of bank runs, and a drastic reduction of both public and private debt. The authors rely on economic theory and historical examples, and state that inflation, according to their calculations, would be very low.

Asked about the paper in 2019, Christine Lagarde, (managing director of the IMF when the paper was published), said she was not convinced "that eliminating the role of private banks in the supply of ‘broad’ money is a good idea".

References

Bibliography
 Douglas, Paul H.; Hamilton, Earl J.; Fisher, Irving; King, Willford I.; Graham, Frank D.; Whittlesey, Charles R. (July 1939), A Program for Monetary Reform (original scanned PDF), (transcript text here), archived from the original (PDF) on 26 July 2011

Great Depression
Monetary policy
Monetary reform